Danian (also Romanized as Dānīān, Dāneyān, Dānyāl, and Daniyan) is a village in Khorram Dasht Rural District, Kamareh District, Khomeyn County, Markazi Province, Iran. At the 2006 census, its population was 114, in 37 families.

References 

Populated places in Khomeyn County